Year 1233 (MCCXXXIII) was a common year starting on Saturday (link will display the full calendar) of the Julian calendar.

Events 
 By place 

 Europe 
 War of the Lombards: Lombard forces at Kyrenia surrender to John of Beirut, after a 10-month siege. The defenders, with their personal belongings, are allowed to retire to Tyre.  Captured prisoners are exchanged for those held by Richard Filangieri, commander of the Lombards, at Tyre. Cyprus is wholly restored under the rule of the 16-year-old King Henry I (the Fat). His vassals are rewarded, and loans that they have made are repaid. 
 August 20 – Oath of Bereg: King Andrew II of Hungary vows to the Holy See that he will not employ Jews and Muslims to administer royal revenues, which causes diplomatic complaints and ecclesiastical censures.
 Winter – Reconquista: King Ferdinand III (the Saint) conquers the cities of Trujillo and Úbeda. The Castilian army besieges the city of Peniscola. Ferdinand forces Ibn Hud, ruler of the Taifa of Zaragoza, to sign a truce.

 England 
 August – Richard Marshal, 3rd Earl of Pembroke, signs an alliance with Llywelyn the Great, to join forces to revolt against King Henry III. Richard is faced by demands from royal bailiffs in September – where the garrison of Usk Castle is forced to surrender.
 November – Henry III's army camped at Grosmont Castle is attacked in the night, by a force of Welsh and English rebels. Several of Henry's supporters are captured, and the castle is returned to  Hubert de Burgh, one of the rebels.

 Mongol Empire 
 May 29 – Mongol–Jin War: The Mongol army led by Ögedei Khan captures Kaifeng, capital of the Jin Dynasty (Great Jin), after a 13-month siege (see Siege of Kaifeng). The Mongols plunder the city, while Emperor Aizong of Jin flees for the town of Caizhou. Meanwhile, Ögedei departs and leaves the final conquest to his favoured general, Subutai.
 December – Siege of Caizhou: The Mongols under Ögedei Khan besiege Caizhou and ally themselves with the Chinese Song Dynasty to eliminate the Jin Dynasty.

 By topic 

 Cities and Towns 
 Gendt receives their city rights from Otto II (the Lame), count of Guelders (modern Netherlands).

 Religion 
 Pope Gregory IX establishes the Papal Inquisition, to regularize the persecution of heresy.

Births 
 August 15 – Philip Benizi, Italian religious leader (d. 1285)
 Adelaide of Burgundy, duchess of Brabant (d. 1273)
 Al-Nawawi, Syrian scholar, jurist and writer (d. 1277)
 Choe Ui, Korean military leader and dictator (d. 1258)
 Ibn al-Quff, Ayyubid physician and surgeon (d. 1286)
 Ibn Manzur, Arab lexicographer and writer (d. 1312)
 Sancho of Castile, archbishop of Toledo (d. 1261)

Deaths 
 January 6 – Matilda (or Maud), English noblewoman (b. 1171)
 January 18 – Yang (or Gongsheng), Chinese empress (b. 1162)
 February 12 – Ermengarde de Beaumont, queen of Scotland
 March 1 – Thomas I (or Tommaso), count of Savoy (b. 1178)
 July 8 – Konoe Motomichi, Japanese nobleman (b. 1160)
 July 26 – Wilbrand of Oldenburg, prince-bishop of Utrecht 
 July 27 – Ferdinand (or Ferrand), count of Flanders (b. 1188)
 July 29 – Savari de Mauléon, French nobleman (b. 1181)
 July 30 – Konrad von Marburg, German priest (b. 1180)
 October 8 – Ugo Canefri, Italian health worker (b. 1148)
 November 22 – Helena, duchess of Brunswick-Lüneburg
 November 27 – Shi Miyuan, Chinese politician (b. 1164)
 Ali ibn al-Athir, Seljuk historian and biographer (b. 1160)
 Bertran de Born (lo Filhs), French troubadour (b. 1179)
 Bohemond IV (the One-Eyed), prince of Antioch (b. 1175)
 Fujiwara no Shunshi, Japanese empress consort (b. 1209)
 Gökböri (Blue-Wolf), Ayyubid general and ruler (b. 1154)
 Guillén Pérez de Guzmán, Spanish nobleman (b. 1180)
 John Apokaukos, Byzantine bishop and theologian 
 Marianus II of Torres, Sardinian Judge of Logudoro
 Mathilde of Angoulême, French noblewoman (b. 1181)
 Sayf al-Din al-Amidi, Ayyubid scholar and jurist (b. 1156)
 Simon of Joinville, French nobleman and knight (b. 1175)
 William Comyn, Scoto-Norman nobleman (b. 1163)
 Yolanda de Courtenay, queen consort of Hungary

References